Vakadu is a village on the bank of Swarnamukhi river in the Indian state of Andhra Pradesh. It is located in Tirupati district and is a mandal headquarters of Vakadu mandal. The village was a part of Gudur mandal.

Notable people 

 N. Janardhana Reddy, former Chief Minister of Andhra Pradesh

References

Bibliography 

 

Villages in Tirupati district
Mandal headquarters in Tirupati district